Douglas John Palazzari (born November 3, 1952 in Eveleth, Minnesota) is a former professional ice hockey player and USA Hockey executive. He is the son of former NHL player Aldo Palazzari. Too small to become a regular in the National Hockey League, Doug Palazzari played a total of 108 games for the St. Louis Blues in 1974–79 but he spent most of his professional career in the minors with the Providence Reds, Kansas City Blues and Salt Lake Golden Eagles where he was a major star. Before turning professional, he was an accomplished player for the Colorado College men's ice hockey team and he also played for the United States national team at the 1973 and 1974 Ice Hockey World Championship tournaments. Palazzari was also a member of the United States team at the inaugural 1976 Canada Cup.

Palazzari is perhaps best known for his management work for amateur hockey in the United States after retiring from professional hockey in 1982. He was elected executive director of USA Hockey in 1999 after spending 14 years with the organization in various capabilities. He resigned as director in 2005. Palazzari was inducted into the United States Hockey Hall of Fame in 2000.

Career statistics

Awards and honors

References

External links
 
 United States Hockey Hall of Fame bio

1952 births
Living people
AHCA Division I men's ice hockey All-Americans
American men's ice hockey centers
American people of Italian descent
Colorado College Tigers men's ice hockey players
Ice hockey people from Minnesota
Kansas City Blues players
Salt Lake Golden Eagles (CHL) players
Sportspeople from Eveleth, Minnesota
St. Louis Blues players
Undrafted National Hockey League players
United States Hockey Hall of Fame inductees
USA Hockey personnel
Ice hockey players from Minnesota